Vyshgorodok (or ) is a selo ('village') in Gavry volost, Pytalovsky District of Pskov Oblast, Russia, founded in the 15th century as a borderline fortress.

History

Pskov Republic

Between the 13th and 15th centuries, the Pskov Republic was engaged in border conflicts with the Livonian Order, Archbishopric of Riga and the Great Duchy of Lithuania. One of these resulted from the Orderial claims for the territories west of the Krasny Gorodok. With the truce of 1476, the Master of the Livonian Order Bernd von der Borch abandoned these claims.

The inhabitants of the Kokshiono parish, however, requested the veche (council) and the Prince of Pskov to secure the border through military means to save them from Livonian raids. In 1476 a wooden fortress was founded on the Lada river by two posadniks of Pskov – Alexey Vassilievich and Moisey Fyodorovich. Construction was completed in 1478. It had a limestone basement, two wooden watchtowers and gates on the edges facing Pskov and Livonia.

In 1479 Livonian knights attacked Vyshgorodok, burning down the fortress and the church and killing the villagers. The next year, 1480, Livonians repeated their raid. Pskov called Muscovy for help and in 1482 joint forces responded with intrusion into the Livonian lands.

The fortress of Vyshgorodok was never restored, but the settlement developed and expanded into a town of Vyshgorodok, hosting the Pskovian garrison that watched the border. The town was ruled by the vicegerent appointed from Pskov and was an administrative center of the county consisting of eight parishes: Borisoglebskaya, Grivskaya, Kokshinskaya, Lebetskaya, Korovskaya Ovsitskaya, Yolkinskaya and Kukhovskaya.

Grand Duchy of Moscow, Tsardom of Russia, Russian Empire

In 1510 Pskov came under the rule of Muscovy. Part of its aristocracy suspected of disloyalty was moved to Vyshgorodok. To watch the border, the town had to maintain a garrison of local militia at its own expense.

In 1581 Polonian units led by King Stephen Báthory passed through Vyshdorodok to besiege Pskov.

In the late 17th century Vyshgorodok hosted two annual trade fairs.

In 1690 the settlement suffered a fire which destroyed much of the housing along the Kovno road.

In 1708 Vyshgorodok was listed in the newly established Saint Petersburg Governorate.

In 1719 Vyshgorodok was transferred to the Pskov Governorate.

Despite Vyshgorodok's name (literally 'town on the hill'), maps and plans of the 18th century list Vyshgorodok as a village.

In 1844 the first municipal school was opened in Vyshgorodok.

In 1897 another school opened by the church.

In 1846 a hospital was founded by the Ministry of the Interior.

As result, Pytalovo gradually became the principal settlement of the county at the expense of Vyshgorodok.

In 1911 a library run by the local teacher Olga Levkovich was opened.

During World War I and the Russian Civil War

After the Bolshevik Government failed to finalize the Treaty of Brest-Litovsk with the Central Powers, the latter resumed their advance eastwards on Pskov and Petrograd, resulting in the village coming under German control.

Shortly after the October Revolution, the Soviets seized control over most of the Pskovian municipalities, including Vyshgorodok. Peasants seized plots of land from local landlords.

In the autumn of 1918 Vyshgorodok was recaptured by the Red Army.

In May 1919 Vyshgorodok appeared on the frontline of advancing pro-czarist Russian North-Western Army of Gen. Nikolai Yudenich supported by Estonian and Latvian republican units. The frontline as of noon 1 February 1920 was stipulated as the border demarcation line by the Latvian–Soviet Peace Treaty of 1920 between the Latvian Republic and Russian Soviet Federative Socialist Republic, which left Vyshgorodok with Latvia.

Latvian Republic and Latvian SSR

From 1920 to 1924 Vyshgorodok belonged to Ludza county. In 1925 it was renamed  (a Latvian translation of the original name) and made part of Pytalovo (1925–1938 Jaunlatgale, 1938–1944 Abrene) county which also contained other territories of the Pskov Governorate annexed to Latvia by the Treaty of 1920.

In 1927 the municipal school of Vyshgorodok was reconstructed to accommodate two schools for Russian and Latvian speakers.

In 1940 the Soviet Union annexed the Latvian Republic and established the Latvian Soviet Socialist Republic (LSSR) within its existing borders as of 1920, so Vyshgorodok belonged to Soviet Latvia.

From July 1941 until June 1944, Vyshgorodok was part of the Nazi occupation zone covered by the Reichskommissariat Ostland, Generalbezirk Lettland, Gebietskommissariat Dunaburg.

Russian SFR and Russian Federation

In January 1945 the border between the Russian SFR and Latvian SSR was redrawn to resemble the historical border between the imperial Governorates of Pskov and Livland. Vyshgorodok was made part of the Pytalovo district of the Pskov oblast. The district of Pytalovo was briefly (1959–1965) discontinued, leaving Vyshgorodok in the district of Ostrov.

Agrarian reform carried out during the late 1940s and 1950s converted local private farming into a state-owned collective farm headquartered in Vyshgorodok. It leased the required machinery from the MTS in Pytalovo up to the 1960s, as the MTS system was abandoned and machines were distributed among local collective farms.

Soon after the USSR collapsed in 1991, the collective farm was privatized and later closed.

Pustoshniki

During the second half of the 19th and early 20th centuries, the western part of the Pskov Governorate including Vyshgorodok experienced major inbound migration from the Baltic provinces, where the serfdom was abandoned half a century earlier than across the rest of Russia. Latvian and Estonian peasantry with no means to buy enough land from their landlords were forced to seek cheaper options available right across the Eastern border of the Governorate of Livonia.

According to the 1911 statistical reference book for the Ostrov county of the Pskov Governorate, Vysgorodok parish accommodated 1,800 immigrants who either purchased or leased plots of land, 300 of whom were from Livonia and Estonia.

Facilities and transport

The village hosts a school, kindergarten, post office and paramedical office.

Vyshgorodok is located at the intersection of the 58K-306 road connecting Ostrov to the border with Latvia and roads to Pytalovo and Kokshino. Regular bus service to Ostrov, Pytalovo and Pskov is available.

Boris and Gleb Church

Initially constructed in the 15th century, it was destroyed by Livonian knights in 1479. In 1690 the church was rebuilt as two adjacent log houses. By the late 19th century it had deteriorated and in 1891 a new red brick church building was completed, having inherited the old altar. Funds to complete the construction of the church were given by Ostrovian landlord Vladimir Izyetdinov, and later by the Rukavishnikov family. The church has survived throughout the period of Latvian governance and during the communist rule.

Gallery

References

External links
1711 Census of the Russian towns, in Russian
Pytalovo town, in Russian
Rural settlements in Petersburg and Pskov Governorates in late XIX-early XX centuries, in Russian
Archeological expedition in Pskov during 1945-1949, story by A.Filimonov, in Russian
Overview of administrative division of the Pskovian land, by B.Kharlashov, in Russian

.

Rural localities in Pskov Oblast
Ostrovsky Uyezd